Takakkaw Falls (also spelled Takkakaw) is a waterfall located in Yoho National Park, near Field, British Columbia in Canada.

"Takakkaw" translates to "magnificent” in Cree. The falls are fed by the meltwater of the Daly Glacier, which is part of the Waputik Icefield. The glacier keeps the volume of the falls up during the warm summer months, and they are a tourist attraction, particularly in late spring after the heavy snow melts, when the falls are at peak condition.

Height
The waterfall was formerly thought to be the tallest in Canada, but a new survey in 1985 found that it is actually shorter than Della Falls on Vancouver Island.

In popular culture
The Takakkaw Falls were featured in the 1995 film Last of the Dogmen.

Gallery

See also
 List of waterfalls
 List of waterfalls of Canada
 Yoho National Park
 Wapta Falls
 Della Falls

References

External links

 Yoho National Park - Parks Canada

Yoho National Park
Waterfalls of British Columbia
Plunge waterfalls
Kootenay Land District